Sici Shelembe is a South African footballer who plays as a midfielder in the National First Division for Vasco da Gama, on loan from Ajax Cape Town.

Career

Ajax Cape Town
Sici Shelembe made his debut for Ajax CT in the 2011-12 season. He scored a goal in his only appearance in the 2011 MTN 8 tournament, and made 5 regular season appearances for the Cape club, during his first season with the A-selection.

Vasco da Gama (loan)
Sici Shelembe was loaned to the neighboring club Vasco da Gama for the duration of the 2012-13 season, in order to gain more experience and enjoy more playing time, where he will play in the National First Division.

References 

1990 births
Living people
People from Umzinyathi District Municipality
Association football defenders
South African soccer players
Witbank Spurs F.C. players
Vasco da Gama (South Africa) players
Cape Town Spurs F.C. players